Sarcopyramis is a genus of flowering plants belonging to the family Melastomataceae.

Its native range is Tropical and Subtropical Asia.

Species:

Sarcopyramis bodinieri 
Sarcopyramis gracilis 
Sarcopyramis napalensis 
Sarcopyramis subramanii

References

Melastomataceae
Melastomataceae genera